"Killbilly Hill" is a song written by Tim Goodman and John McFee, and recorded by American country music group Southern Pacific.  It was released in December 1986 as the second single and title track from the album Killbilly Hill.  The song reached number 37 on the Billboard Hot Country Singles & Tracks chart.

Chart performance

References

1987 singles
1986 songs
Southern Pacific (band) songs
Song recordings produced by Jim Ed Norman
Songs written by John McFee
Songs written by Tim Goodman
Warner Records singles